Ó Gadhra or O'Gara is an Irish surname which originated in the kingdom of Luighne Connacht.  Variants include Garry, Geary, Gerry, and Guiry.

Background

The first O'Garas were descendants of the Gailenga people. Their descendants were located in Sliabh Lugha (later known as the barony of Gallen), the southern part of the territory ruled by the Kings of Luighne Connacht.

In the 13th century they were expelled from the area (by the Clan Mac Siúrtáin) and moved to Cul Ui Fionn, later known as the barony of Coolavin, County Sligo.

Notable bearers of the name

 Domhnall mac Gadhra, King of Luighne Connacht, died 931.
 Toichleach Ua Gadhra, King of Gailenga, died 964.
 Donn Sléibhe Ua Gadhra, King of Sliabh Lugha, died 1181.
 Ruaidrí Ó Gadhra, last King of Sliabh Lugha, died 1256.
 Ruaidri Ó Gadhra, Irish lord, died 1285.
 Fearghal Ó Gadhra, lord of Coolavin, patron of the Annals of the Four Masters, c. 1597-after 1660.
 Oliver O'Gara, Irish soldier and politician of the 17th century
 John Patrick O'Gara, French-born soldier in the Spanish Army
 Charles O'Gara (1699-1777), courtier and official of the Holy Roman Empire 
 Matt O'Gara, Irish sportsperson, fl. 1960.
 Ronan O'Gara, Irish rugby union rugby player, born 1977.
 Eoghan O'Gara, Irish sportsperson, alive 2010.

See also

 Ó Gadhra Chiefs of the Name
 Kings of Sliabh Lugha
 Kings of Luighne Connacht

References

Further reading
 The History of the County of Mayo to the Close of the Sixteenth Century. With illustrations and three maps, Hubert T. Knox. Originally published 1908, Hogges Figgies and Co. Dublin. Reprinted by De Burca rare books, 1982. .
 Irish Names and Surnames, pp. 100. Patrick Woulfe, Dublin : M. H. Gill, 1922
 Muintir Ghadhra, an t-Athair Fearghus Báiréad, OFM, pp. 45–66, Measgra i gcuimhne Mhichíl Uí Chléirigh. Miscellany of historical and linguistic studies in honour of Brother Michael Ó Cléirigh, chief of the Four Masters, 1643-1943, ed. by Father Sylvester O'Brien, Assisi Press, Dublin, 1944.
 The Surnames of Ireland, Edward MacLysaght, Dublin, 1978.

External links
 
 Irish Times database

Surnames
Surnames of Irish origin
Irish families
Irish-language surnames